Theriot is the name of some places in the U.S. state of Louisiana:

Theriot, Terrebonne Parish, Louisiana
Theriot, Lafourche Parish, Louisiana